Juan José Aranguren is an Argentine businessman. He was Chairman of Royal Dutch Shell of Argentina for fifteen years and served as Minister of Energy during the Mauricio Macri's administration.

Biography
Aranguren was born in the Entre Ríos Province, and became a chemical engineer at the University of Buenos Aires.

Royal Dutch Shell
He joined Shell Argentina in 1979, and became a director from 1997 to 2015. He opposed the administration of president Nestor and Cristina Kirchner and won several cases against the state for the state-controlled prices.

Minister of Energy
He was appointed Minister of Energy by Mauricio Macri in 2015. Aranguren arranged the removal of state subsidies to electricity, gas, and water distribution, which caused a huge increase in the taxes for those services. 

Those increases were met by protests in numerous cities by people bearing banners, bugles, and noise-making cacerolazos. The government justified it as a required step to reduce the huge fiscal deficit, and pointed that the subsidy system had almost ruined the whole energy distribution system. 

Macri explained this at the State of the State report, and Aranguren at an audience at the Congress. Several courts nulled the tax increase, as it had been ordered with a previous audience with customers to explain it, as required by law. The Supreme Court ratified the temporary halt to the tax increase, but only for residential customers. The customer audiences were celebrated in September.

Controversies

Conflict of interest 
Although he resigned to Shell to work as a minister of Energy, he still kept shares for $16.3 million from the company. There was a controversy over it, as some of his rulings benefited Shell, and he may have had a conflict of interest in it. Aranguren considered that there was no conflict of interest, but sold his shares anyway, as suggested by the anticorruption office. He considered that government transparency had to clear for the Argentine society.

Paradise Papers
On 5 November 2017, the Paradise Papers, a set of confidential electronic documents relating to offshore investment, revealed that Aranguren have managed two offshore companies, Shell Western Supply and Trading Limited and Sol Antilles y Guianas Limited, both subsidiaries of Royal Dutch Shell. One is the main bidder for the purchase of diesel oil by the current government through the state owned CAMMESA (Compañía Administradora del Mercado Mayorista Eléctrico).

References

Ministers of energy of Argentina
Argentine business executives
University of Buenos Aires alumni
Argentine people of Basque descent
Living people
1954 births
Argentine anti-communists